The Royal College of Surgeons is an ancient college (a form of corporation) established in England to regulate the activity of surgeons. Derivative organisations survive in many present and former members of the Commonwealth. These organisations are now also responsible for training surgeons and setting their examinations.

History
The earliest form of the Royal College of Surgeons was the "Guild of Surgeons Within the City of London" founded in the 14th century. There was dispute between the surgeons and barber surgeons until an agreement was signed between them in 1493, giving the fellowship of surgeons the power of incorporation. The Guild of Barbers of Dublin received a Royal Charter of Henry VI in 1446, making it the earliest Royal Medical incorporation in Britain or Ireland. This was followed in 1505 by the incorporation of the Barber Surgeons of Edinburgh as a Craft Guild of Edinburgh. This body was granted a royal charter in 1506 by King James IV of Scotland. It was followed by the Royal College of Physicians and Surgeons of Glasgow, granted a charter by King by James VI in 1599, as the Glasgow Faculty.

The union in London was formalised further in 1540 by King Henry VIII of England between the Worshipful Company of Barbers (incorporated 1462) and the Guild of Surgeons to form the Company of Barber-Surgeons. In 1745 the surgeons broke away from the barbers to form the Company of Surgeons. In 1800 the Company was granted a Royal Charter to become the Royal College of Surgeons in London. A further charter in 1843 granted it the present title of the Royal College of Surgeons of England. In 2010 Professor Eilis McGovern became President of the Royal College of Surgeons in Ireland and thereby the first female President of any Royal College of Surgeons in the world.

Organisations
Royal College of Surgeons of Edinburgh (incorporated 1505 as a Guild of Barber-Surgeons by the city, Royal Charter 1506)
Royal College of Surgeons of England (incorporated 1493, chartered 1800)
Royal College of Physicians and Surgeons of Glasgow (founded 1599)
Royal College of Surgeons in Ireland (Royal charter 1446 as a Guild, the earliest Royal Medical foundation in Britain or Ireland; Royal Charter as Royal College of Surgeons in Ireland 1784)
Royal Australasian College of Surgeons (chartered 1927)
Royal College of Physicians and Surgeons of Canada (chartered 1929)
Royal College of Dental Surgeons of Ontario (chartered 1868)

See also
 Membership of the Royal College of Surgeons
 Fellowship of the Royal College of Surgeons

References

Medical education
Royal colleges